Reuterswärd is a surname. Notable people with the surname include:

Carl Fredrik Reuterswärd (1934–2016), Swedish artist
Maud Reuterswärd (1920–1980), Swedish writer
Mikael Reuterswärd (1964–2010), Swedish adventurer
Oscar Reutersvärd (1915–2002), Swedish artist